The 2014 Maserati Challenger was a professional tennis tournament played on clay courts. It was the second edition of the tournament which was part of the 2014 ATP Challenger Tour. It took taking place in Meerbusch, Germany, between 11 and 17 August 2014.

Entrants

Seeds 

 1 Rankings as of 4 August 2014

Other entrants 
The following players received wildcards into the singles main draw:
  Attila Balázs 
  Jozef Kovalík 
  Philipp Petzschner 
  Jan Oliver Sadlowski 

The following players received entry from the qualifying draw:
  Philipp Davydenko
  Christian Garin
  Laurent Lokoli
  Matthias Wunner

Champions

Singles 

  Jozef Kovalík def.  Andrey Kuznetsov 6–1, 6–4

Doubles 

 Matthias Bachinger /  Dominik Meffert def.  Gong Maoxin /  Peng Hsien-yin 6–3, 3–6, [10–6]

External links 
 

Maserati Challenger
Maserati Challenger
Maserati Challenger